The Addams Family is an American animated sitcom adaptation of the Charles Addams single-panel comic for The New Yorker. The show was produced by Hanna-Barbera Productions for Saturday mornings in 1973, and was later rebroadcast the following season. Jackie Coogan and Ted Cassidy, who played Uncle Fester and Lurch, respectively, in the 1960s television series, returned in voice-over roles. The cast also included 10-year-old Jodie Foster, who performed the voice of Pugsley Addams. The show's theme music was completely different and had no lyrics or finger snapping, but retained a recognizable part of the four-note score from the live-action series.

Plot
The Addams Family consists of husband and wife Gomez and Morticia Addams, their children Wednesday and Pugsley, as well as Grandmama, Uncle Fester, Thing, Cousin Itt, and their butler, Lurch. The Addamses are a close-knit extended family with decidedly macabre interests and supernatural abilities. No explanation for their powers is explicitly given in the series.

This series depicts the Addamses on a cross-country road trip, exploring the United States in their Victorian-style creepy camper that resembles their mansion. Along the way, they stop off at various locations and venues. They inadvertently cause mayhem wherever they go due to their unusual interests and mannerisms, their willingness to trust those who probably shouldn't be trusted (although they do occasionally aid others who genuinely need help), and their getting swept up in criminal schemes or problems without their knowledge.

Voice cast
 Lennie Weinrib – Gomez
 Janet Waldo – Morticia, Grandmama
 Jackie Coogan – Uncle Fester
 Cindy Henderson – Wednesday
 Jodie Foster – Pugsley
 Ted Cassidy – Lurch
 John Stephenson – Cousin Itt
 Pat Harrington Jr. – Various roles
 Bob Holt – Various roles
 Herb Vigran – Various roles
 Don Messick - Various roles
 Josh Albee - Various roles
 John Carver - Various roles
 Howard Caine - Various roles
 Frank Welker - Various roles (The Addams Family Goes West only, (uncredited))

Development

Scooby-Doo appearance
The Addams Family's first animated appearance was on the third episode of Hanna-Barbera's The New Scooby-Doo Movies, "Scooby-Doo Meets the Addams Family" (a.k.a. "Wednesday is Missing"), which first aired on CBS Saturday morning on September 23, 1972. John Astin, Carolyn Jones, Jackie Coogan, and Ted Cassidy provided the voices for their respective Addams Family characters while voice actors were used to voice Grandmama, Wednesday, Pugsley, and Cousin Itt. The episode details the Addams Family in a mystery with the Scooby-Doo gang. The Addams Family characters were drawn to the specifications of the original Charles Addams comics.

The Addams Family get their own cartoon
The first animated series ran on Saturday mornings from 1973–1975 on NBC. In a departure from the original series, this series took the Addamses on the road in a Victorian-style recreational vehicle (RV) that resembles their house. This series followed the relationships of the original Addams comics in that Fester is Gomez's brother, and Grandmama is Morticia's mother. Many cast members from the original series and the Scooby-Doo episode reprise their roles in the series, with the exceptions of John Astin and Carolyn Jones whose characters were voiced by Lennie Weinrib and Janet Waldo. Ted Cassidy was a frequent voice actor for Hanna-Barbera television productions at the time, and had previously voiced Lurch for New Scooby Doo Movies. The show also introduces the Addams Family's animal companions Ali the alligator, Ocho the octopus and Mr. V the vulture, who are often seen with their fellow pet Kitty Kat the lion.

Episodes

Public service announcements
Concurrently with their series, the animated Addams characters appeared in public service announcements for the Boy Scouts of America (featuring Pugsley as a Scout), the four nutritious food groups then promoted by the USDA, and forest fire prevention for the United States Forest Service.

Broadcast history
Telecast: NBC Saturday Morning September 8, 1973 – August 30, 1975

Sept. – Dec. 1973, NBC Saturday 9:00–9:30 AM (EDT)
Jan. – Aug. 1974, NBC Saturday 8:30–9:00 AM (EDT)
Sept. 1974 – Aug. 1975, NBC Saturday 8:00–8:30 AM (EDT)

Home media
In October 2010, Warner Archive released The Addams Family: The Complete Series on DVD in region 1 as part of their Hanna-Barbera Classics Collection.  This is a manufacture-on-demand release, available exclusively through Warner's online store and Amazon.com. The series is also available for purchase at the iTunes Store.

Comic book series
From 1974 to 1975, Gold Key Comics produced a comic book series in connection with the show, but it only lasted three issues. Each issue was adapted from a TV episode, starting with "In Search of the Boola-Boola" (October 1974).

See also

The Addams Family (1992 animated series)

References

External links

The Addams Family (1973) at Don Markstein's Toonopedia. Archived from the original on March 13, 2012.

The Addams Family television series
1970s American animated television series
1970s American horror comedy television series
1970s American sitcoms
1970s black comedy television series
1973 American television series debuts
1973 American television series endings
American animated sitcoms
American black comedy television shows
American children's animated comedy television series
American children's animated fantasy television series
American children's animated horror television series
Animated television series about families
Animated television series reboots
English-language television shows
NBC original programming
Television series about vacationing
Witchcraft in television
Television series by Hanna-Barbera